Ole Magnus Ekelund (born 20 April 1980) is a Norwegian handball player, currently playing for Danish Handball League side FCK Håndbold.

External links
 player info

1980 births
Living people
Norwegian male handball players
Expatriate handball players
Norwegian expatriate sportspeople in Denmark